Noah Steiner (born 26 February 1999) is an Austrian football player. He plays for First Vienna FC.

Club career
He made his Austrian Football Bundesliga debut for St. Pölten on 24 August 2019 in a game against Mattersburg.

First Vienna
On 15 January 2020, Steiner joined First Vienna FC on a contract for the rest of the season.

References

External links
 

1999 births
Living people
Austrian footballers
Association football defenders
FK Austria Wien players
SV Schwechat players
SKN St. Pölten players
First Vienna FC players
Austrian Football Bundesliga players
Austrian Regionalliga players